Turks in the Netherlands (occasionally and colloquially Dutch Turks or Turkish-Dutch;) refers to people of full or partial Turkish ethnicity living in the Netherlands. They form the largest ethnic minority group in the country; thus, the Turks are the second-largest ethnic group in the Netherlands after the ethnic Dutch. The majority of Dutch Turks descend from the Republic of Turkey; however, there has also been significant Turkish migration waves from other post-Ottoman countries including ethnic Turkish communities which have come to the Netherlands from the Balkans (e.g. from Bulgaria, Greece, Kosovo, North Macedonia and Romania), the island of Cyprus, as well as from other parts of the Levant (especially Iraq). More recently, during the European migrant crisis significant waves of Turkish minorities from Syria and Kosovo have also arrived in the Netherlands. In addition, there has been migration to the Netherlands from the Turkish diaspora; many Turkish-Belgians and Turkish-Germans have arrived in the country as Belgian and German citizens.

History 
There have been various Turkish migration waves to the Netherlands from all modern nation-states which were once part of the Ottoman Empire and which still consist of ethnic Turkish communities. The majority of Dutch-Turks have immigrated from (or descend from) the Republic of Turkey. However, there are also significant ethnic Turkish communities which have come to the Netherlands from the Balkans (especially from Bulgaria, Greece, and North Macedonia), Cyprus, the Levant (especially from Iraq), and North Africa. Due to the European migrant crisis a substantial number of ethnic Turks have also arrived from Syria and Kosovo. Moreover, many Turkish-Belgians and Turkish-Germans in the diaspora have also come to the Netherlands as Belgian and German citizens.

Turkish migration from the Ottoman Empire

The first Turkish settlers in the Netherlands dates back to the 16th century, when Ottoman Turkish traders settled in many Dutch and Flemish trading towns. The English traveller Andrew Marvell referred to the Netherlands as "the place for Turk, Christian, heathen, Jew; staple place for sects and schisms" due to the religious freedom and the large number of different religious groups there. References to the Ottoman state and Islamic symbolism were also frequently used within 16th century Dutch society itself, most notably in Protestant speeches called hagenpreken, and in the crescent-shaped medals of the Geuzen, bearing the inscription "Rather Turkish than Papists". When Dutch forces broke through the Spanish siege of Leiden in 1574, they carried with them Turkish flags into the city. During the Siege of Sluis in Zeeland in 1604, 1,400 Turkish slaves were freed by Maurice of Orange from captivity by the Spanish army. The Turks were declared free people and the Dutch state paid for their repatriation. To honour the resistance of the Turkish slaves, Prince Maurice named a local embankment "Turkeye".

Diplomat Cornelius Haga gained trading privileges from Constantinople for the Dutch Republic in 1612, some 40 years before any other nation recognized Dutch independence. Two years later the Ottomans sent their emissary Ömer Aga to the Netherlands to intensify the relations between the two states.

Turkish migration from the Republic of Turkey

During the 1950s, successive Dutch governments strongly stimulated emigration from the Netherlands, while at the same time the economy grew rapidly. The Netherlands began to face a labour shortage by the mid-1950s already, which became more serious during the early 1960s, as the country experienced even higher economic growth rates, comparable to the rest of Europe. At the same time, Turkey had a problem of unemployment, low GNP levels and a high population growth. So the import of labour solved problems on both ends. The first Turkish immigrants arrived in the Netherlands in the beginning of the 1960s at a time when the Dutch economy was wrestling with a shortage of workers. On 19 August 1964, the Dutch government entered into a 'recruitment agreement' with Turkey. Thereafter, the number of Turkish workers in the Netherlands increased rapidly.

There were two distinct periods of recruitment. During the first period, which lasted until 1966, a large number of Turks came to the Netherlands through unofficial channels, either being recruited by employers or immigrating spontaneously. A small economic recession began in 1966. Some of the labour migrants were forced to return to Turkey. In 1968, the economy picked up again and a new recruitment period, which was to last until 1974, commenced. In May 1968, new European Economic Community rules forced the Netherlands to instate a travel visa system to regulate labour immigration and from then on, the state recruited foreign workers. The peak of Turkish labour migration occurred during these years. The Turks eventually surpassed other migrant nationalities in numbers and came to represent the Dutch image of guest workers.

Most Turks came to the Netherlands in order to work and save enough money to build a house, expand the family business or start their own business in Turkey. Thus, the decision to emigrate was made primarily for economic reasons. Most of the labour migrants did not come from the lowest strata of the Turkish population, nor did emigration begin in the least developed parts of Turkey, but in the big cities such as Istanbul, Ankara and Izmir. Only later did less urbanised areas become involved with the immigration process. Ultimately, the largest numbers of Turks did come from these areas. Most Turks in the Netherlands come from villages and provincial cities in the middle of the country and on the coast of the Black Sea.

At the end of 1973, the labour recruitment was nearly brought to a halt, and the Turks were no longer admitted to the Netherlands as labour migrants. Turkish immigration, however, continued practically unabatedly through the process of family reunification. Even more Turkish men began to bring their families to the Netherlands in the 1970s. In the first half of the 1980s, the Turkish net immigration began to decrease, but, in 1985, it began to rise again. Most of them had a bride or bridegroom come over from their native land. This marriage immigration still continues, though net immigration has again decreased in the 1990s.

Turkish migration from the Balkans

Bulgaria

In 2009 The Sofia Echo reported that Turkish Bulgarians were now the fastest-growing group of immigrants in the Netherlands. At the time, they numbered between 10,000 and 30,000. Similarly, De Telegraaf and De Pers have also reported that the Turkish Bulgarians were the fast-growing group of migrants; furthermore, the Turkish Bulgarians formed 90% of Bulgarian citizens arriving in the Netherlands. The majority, of about 80%, have come from the south-eastern Bulgarian district of Kardzhali (Kırcaali) which has a Turkish majority population.

Although Bulgaria joined the European Union during the 2007 enlargement, the rights of Bulgarian citizens to work freely as EU nationals in the Netherlands came into full effect on 1 January 2014. Consequently, there were strong indications that the migration of Turkish Bulgarians to the Netherlands (as well as other parts of Europe) would continue.

Indeed, a 2015 study by Mérove Gijsberts and Marcel Lubbers found that Turkish Bulgarians were more likely to stay in the Netherlands than ethnic Bulgarians; it also found that Turkish Bulgarians were much more satisfied with their lives in the Netherlands than the ethnic Bulgarians.

Greece

Members of the Turkish minority of Western Thrace in Greece began to migrate to the Netherlands in the 1960s, increasing further in the 1970s. Initially, these early migrants intended to return to Greece after working for a number of years in the Netherlands; however, the Greek government used Article 19 of the 1955 Greek Constitution to strip some members of the Turkish minority living abroad of their Greek citizenship. Consequently, many ethnic Turks were forced to remain in the Western European countries they had settled in, which, in turn, also established the permanent Turkish Western Thracian community in the Netherlands.  By 1983, the Western Thrace Turks founded their first organisation, the Alblasserdam Batı Trakya Türkleri Cemiyeti ("Alblasserdam Western Thrace Turks Association"), in the town of Alblasserdam.

More recently, the community has increased significantly due to the large numbers of new arrivals since the twenty-first century. For many, the Greek government-debt crisis in 2007-08 was a big factor in seeking better economic opportunities in the Netherlands. In 2009 the Western Thrace Turks established the Hollanda Batı Trakya Türk Kültür ve Dayanışma Derneği ("Western Thrace Turks Culture and Solidarity Association of the Netherlands") which consists of cognates residing in different regions of the Netherlands. By 2017, the Hollanda Lahey Batı Trakya Türk Birlik ve Beraberlik Derneği ("Hague Western Thrace Turks Unity Association of the Netherlands") was established by the community living in The Hague. Many have settled in the Randstad region. After Germany, the Netherlands is the most popular destination for Turkish immigrants from Western Thrace.

Between 1970 and 2018, approximately 100,000 Western Thrace Turks have immigrated to Germany, the Netherlands and the United Kingdom.

North Macedonia

Some members of the Turkish Macedonian minority have emigrated to the Netherlands for better economic opportunities.

Romania
Since the first decade of the twenty-first century, there has been a significant decrease in the population of the Turkish Romanian minority group due to the admission of Romania into the European Union and the subsequent relaxation of the travelling and migration regulations. Thus, Turkish Romanians, especially from the Dobruja region, have joined other Romanian citizens in migrating mostly to Western European countries, including the Netherlands.

Turkish migration from the Levant

Cyprus
 
The majority of the Turkish Cypriots left the island of Cyprus due to economic and political reasons in the 20th century. Traditionally, most who migrated to Western Europe settled in the United Kingdom, Germany, France and Austria; however, since the 1990s, the Netherlands began to attract the bulk of Turkish Cypriot migrants.

Iraq

Significant migration waves from the Turkish Iraqi community to the Netherlands occurred during the Iran–Iraq War (1980–88), the Gulf War (1991), and the Iraq War (2003–11). According to Professor Suphi Saatçi, in 2010 the Iraqi Turks in the Netherlands numbered around 4,000. Iraqi Turks have continued to migrate to the Netherlands during the European migrant crisis (2014–19).

Syria 

Due to the Syrian civil war, many Syrian Turks were forced to initially take refuge in Turkey; from there, many continued Westwards, especially during the European migrant crisis (2014–19). The majority of Turkish Syrian refugees arrived in the Netherlands via the highway through Macedonia, Serbia, Croatia, Austria and Germany.

Turkish migration from the modern diaspora

In addition to ethnic Turkish people that have migrated to the Netherlands from traditional areas of settlement in post-Ottoman modern nation-states, there has also been an increasing migration wave to the Netherlands from other countries in the modern Turkish diaspora. For example, members of the Turkish German and Turkish Belgian communities have also settled in the Netherlands. Most have emigrated using their EU citizenship rights (i.e. the freedom of movement) as German or Belgian nationals.

Demographics 

Turkish immigrants first began to settle in big cities in the Netherlands such as Amsterdam, Rotterdam, The Hague and Utrecht as well as the regions of Twente and Limburg, where there was a growing demand for industrial labour. However, not only the large cities but also medium-sized cities, and even small villages attracted the Turks.

The Turkish population is mostly concentrated in large cities in the west of the country; some 36% of Turks live in the Randstad region.  The second most common settlements are in the south, in the Limburg region, in Eindhoven and Tilburg, and in the east: in Deventer, as well as in Enschede and Almelo in the Twente region.

Characteristics
Official data published by Statistics Netherlands only collects data on the country of birth and does not provide data on ethnicity. Consequently, the 410,000 people recorded from Turkey (first and second-generation only) in 2019 is not a true reflection of the total ethnic Turkish population. Firstly, the significant number of ethnic Turkish communities which have arrived in the Netherlands from the Balkans, Cyprus, the Levant, North Africa, and the diaspora (e.g Belgium and Germany) are recorded according to their citizenship, such as "Belgian", "Bulgarian", "Cypriot", "German", "Greek", "Iraqi", "Lebanese" "Macedonian", "Syrian" etc. rather than by their Turkish ethnicity. Although these ethnic Turkish communities have different nationalities, they share the same ethnic, linguistic, cultural and religious origins as mainland ethnic Turks. Secondly, Statistic Netherlands does not provide any data on Dutch-born citizens of ethnic Turkish origin who are from the third, fourth or fifth generations.

The percentage of first and second generation Turks marrying a bride or groom from Dutch descent has been stable at around 5-10% from 2001 to 2015.

Population estimates

The estimates on the Turkish-Dutch community have varied. Suzanne Aalberse et al. have said that, despite the official Dutch statistics, "over the years" the Turkish community "must have numbered half a million". Sometimes sources casually mention much higher estimates, equalling the official total number of non-western immigrants and their descendants. As early as 2003, the political scientist and international relations expert Dr Nathalie Tocci said that there was already "two million Turks in Holland". Rita van Veen also reported in Trouw that there was 2 million Turks in the Netherlands in 2007. More recently, in 2020, an article published in L1mburg Centraal stated that there are more than 2 million Dutch-Turks. Voetbal International also reported in 2020 that the Dutch football club Fortuna Sittard will be carrying out annual scouting activities to find "Turkish talent"  among the approximately 2 million Turkish-Dutch community. The Daily Sabah has also reported that "Turks are the second-largest ethnic group in the Netherlands following the Dutch, with a population of about 2 million."

The total amount of first and second generation Turks increased from 271.514 in 1996 to 429.978 in 2022.

Emigration
According to a study by Petra Wieke de Jong, focusing on second-generation Turkish-Dutch people who were specifically born in the years 1983 to 1992 only, there was 6,914 people from this age group and generation who left the Netherlands and emigrated to other countries as Dutch citizens between the years 2001 and 2017. Of those who reported their destination, the most popular country was to Turkey (37.78%), followed by Belgium (17.47%), Germany (11.64%) and the United Kingdom (1.48%). In addition, some of these emigrants reported moving to other EU countries (3.43%) or to outside the EU (2.7%). However, a large portion of these Turkish-Dutch emigrants, totaling 1,761 (i.e. 25.47%), did not report their destination of emigration.

Culture

Language 

The first generation of Turkish immigrants is predominantly Turkish-speaking and has only limited Dutch competence. Thus, for immigrant children, their early language input is Turkish, but the Dutch language quickly enters their lives via playmates and day-care centres. By age six, these children are often bilinguals.

Adolescents have developed a code-switching mode which is reserved for in-group use. With older members of the Turkish community and with strangers, Turkish is used, and if Dutch speakers enter the scene, a switch to Dutch is made.  The young bilinguals, therefore, speak normal Turkish with their elders, and a kind of Dutch-Turkish with each other.

Religion 

When family reunification resulted in the establishment of Turkish communities, the preservation of Turkish culture became a more serious matter. Most Turks consider Islam to be the centre of their culture. Thus, the majority of Dutch Turks adheres to Sunni Islam, although there is also a considerable Alevi fragment. According to the latest figures issued by Statistics Netherlands, approximately five percent of the Dutch population (850,000 persons), were followers of Islam in 2006. Furthermore, eighty-seven percent of Turks were followers of Islam. The Turkish community accounted for almost forty percent of the Muslim population; thus are the largest ethnic group in the Netherlands adhering to Islam.

Turks are considered to be the most organised ethnic group with its activities and organisations. The Turkish Islamic Cultural Federation (TICF) which was founded in 1979, had seventy-eight member associations by the early 1980s, and continued to grow to reach 140 by the end of the 1990s. It works closely with the Turkish-Islamic Union for Religious Affairs (Diyanet), which provides the TICF with the imams which it employs in its member mosques.

The Turkish Directorate of Religious Affairs (Diyanet) established a branch in the Netherlands in 1982 with the intent to oppose the influence of leftist asylum seekers from Turkey as well as rightist members of Islamist movements such as Millî Görüş. In 1983, the Netherlands agreed to allowing Turkey to send its own imams to the Turkish guest worker communities. Critics of this agreement argue that these imams, some of whom do not speak Dutch, hinder the effective integration of Dutch-Turkish Muslims into the society of the Netherlands by promoting allegiance to the Turkish state while neglecting to promote loyalty to the Dutch state.

Of the 475 mosques in the Netherlands in 2018, a plurality (146) are controlled by the Turkish Directorate of Religious Affairs (Diyanet). Diyanet implements the political ideology of the Islamist Turkish AKP party. Diyanet mosques, have stayed out of initiatives to train imams in the Netherlands which were designed to train Islamic preachers who were familiar with the European context and to promote Dutch values and norms. This resistance is based on that it would be more difficult to import Diyanet imams, who are employees of the Turkish state, from Turkey if they cooperated in Dutch imam training programs. Diyanet imams receive benefits and political tasks which are comparable to those of Turkish diplomats.

In April 2006, the Turkish Mevlana Mosque had been voted the most attractive building in Rotterdam in a public survey organised by the City Information Centre. It had beaten the Erasmus Bridge due to the mosques 'symbol of warmth and hospitality'.

Politics 

Dutch Turks generally support left-wing political parties (DENK, PvdA, D66, GroenLinks, and SP) over the right-wing ones (CDA, VVD and SGP). In the past, migrants were not as eager to vote. However, they are now aware that they can become a decisive factor in the Dutch political system. Far-right groups have taunted the Dutch Labour Party, the PvdA, for becoming the Party of the Allochthonous because of the votes they receive from migrants and the increase in the number of elected ethnic Turkish candidates. Turkish votes determine about two seats of the 150 representatives in the Second Chamber of the Staten-Generaal. During the Dutch general election (2002), there were fourteen candidates of Turkish origin spread out over six-party lists which encouraged fifty-five percent of Turks to vote, which was a much higher turnout than any other ethnic minorities.

Political parties founded by Dutch Turks 

In February, 2015, Turkish-born Dutch parliamentarians, Tunahan Kuzu and Selçuk Öztürk, established the political party DENK (which in Dutch means "think" and in Turkish means "equal" or "balanced"). In its manifesto, DENK was established to combat their perceived rising intolerance, right-wing thinking, and xenophobia in the Netherlands. The party carries the program advanced by the International Institute for Scientific Research, based in the Hague, with the purpose of decolonization. Consequently, the party has been in direct response to the "nativist and isolationalist positions promoted by Geert Wilders" and his populist right Freedom Party. Among its policies, DENK seeks to: establish a "racism register" to track and condemn the use of hate speech against religion; build a Dutch slavery museum; abolish the black minstrel character Zwarte Piet ("Black Pete"); and ban the use of the derogatory Dutch word "Allochtoon". Although the party has been popularly described as a "Muslim political party", DENK "does not promote Muslim canadidates as do most similar political parties in Europe". In the 2017 elections, votes for DENK exceeded those of the PVdA and Wilders's PVV in Rotterdam and The Hague; moreover, DENK also exceeded the PVV's votes in Amsterdam. The party won three seats at the 2017 election; thus, DENK is the first migrant-founded party to gain seats in the Dutch national parliament. In the 2021 elections the party stayed at 3 seats.

Literature
A number of Turkish-Dutch writers have come to prominence.  Halil Gür was one of the earliest, writing short stories about Turkish immigrants. Sadik Yemni is well known for his Turkish-Dutch detective stories. Sevtap Baycili is a more intellectual novelist, who is not limited to migrant themes.

Anti-Turkism

Even though progressive policies are installed, "especially compared with those in some other European countries such as Germany". Managing the multicultural society: The policy making process. Paper presented at the Conference on Today's Youth and Xenophobia: Breaking the Cycle. Wassenaar, Netherlands: Netherlands Institute for Advanced Study. The European Commission against Racism and Intolerance published its third report on Netherlands in 2008. In this report, Turkish minority group is described as a notable community which have been particularly affected by "stigmatisation of and discrimination against members of minority groups" as a result of controversial policies of the governments of Netherlands. The same report also noted that "the tone of Dutch political and public debate around integration and other issues relevant to ethnic minorities has experienced a dramatic deterioration".

Recently, use of the word "allochtonen" as a "catch-all expression" for "the other" emerged as a new development. European Network against Racism, an international organisation supported by European Commission reported that, in Netherlands, half of the Turks reported having experienced racial discrimination. Same report points "dramatic growth of islamophobia" parallel with antisemitism. Another international organisation European Monitoring Centre on Racism and Xenophobia highlighted negative trend in Netherlands, regarding attitudes towards minorities, compared to average EU results. The analysis also noted that compared to most other Europeans, in the Netherlands, majority group is "more in favour of cultural assimilation of minorities" rather than "cultural enrichment by minority groups".

Crime 
In 2015, individuals with a Turkish background were about 2.5 times as likely to be suspected of a crime compared to the overall native Dutch population, with of the first generation 1.7% being suspected, and of the second generation 3.6% (total males 4.28% and women 0.67%). However, when corrected for socio-economic position, Dutch people of Turkish descent are not more often suspected of crime than native Dutch people, according to numbers from 2012 and reports from 2014.

Education 
According to The Netherlands Institute for Social Research annual report of 2005, most of the original first-generation Turkish migrants of the 1960s and 1970s had a very low level of education with many of them having had little or no schooling at all. In addition to these, many of the Turkish "marriage migrants" who arrived in the Netherlands by marrying an immigrant already living in the country as well as the 'in-between-generation' which arrived while aged 6–18 have a low education. An outcome of this circumstance is a poor command of the Dutch language.

All Turkish children of the second generation have attended primary and secondary education. However, their educational levels were on average lower. While almost half of the native Dutch population (and Iranian origin pupils) had ever attended higher secondary education (HAVO) or pre-university education (VWO), only a fifth of the Turkish second generation had. In 2015, the Turkish second generation percentage had increased to 27%.

Associations and Organisations
Alblasserdam Batı Trakya Türkleri Cemiyeti ("Alblasserdam Western Thrace Turks Association")
Hollanda Türk Federasyon ("Turkish Federation of the Netherlands")
Hollanda Batı Trakya Türk Kültür ve Dayanışma Derneği ("Western Thrace Turks Culture and Solidarity Association of the Netherlands")
Hollanda Balkan Türkleri Kültür ve Dayanışma Derneği ("Balkan Turks Culture and Solidarity Association of the Netherlands")
Hollanda Bulgaristan Türkleri Derneği ("Bulgarian Turks Association of the Netherlands")
Hollanda Irak Türkmen Diasporası Derneği ("Iraqi Turkmen Disapora Association of the Netherlands")
Hollanda Lahey Batı Trakya Türk Birlik ve Beraberlik Derneği ("Hague Western Thrace Turks Unity Association of the Netherlands")
Irak Türkleri Gök Hilal Vakfı ("Iraqi Turkish Sky Crescent Foundation")
Türkmen Tanış Derneği ("Turkmen Meeting Association")

Notable people

See also 
List of Turkish Dutch people
Netherlands–Turkey relations
FC Türkiyemspor
Turkeye
Turkish Workers' Union in the Netherlands
Turkish diaspora
Turks in Europe
Turks in Belgium
Turks in France
Turks in Germany
Turks in the United Kingdom
2017 Dutch–Turkish diplomatic incident

References

Bibliography 

.
.

.
.

.

.
.
.

.
.
.

.

.
.
.

External links 

 Turks in the Netherlands 

Netherlands
Netherlands
Islam in the Netherlands
 Turkish-Dutch
Middle Eastern diaspora in the Netherlands
Ethnic groups in the Netherlands
Muslim communities in Europe